Zilner Trenton Randolph (January 28, 1899 – February 2, 1994) was an American jazz trumpeter, arranger, and music educator.

Early life
Randolph was born in Dermott, Arkansas, on January 28, 1899. He attended Biddle University, the Kreuger Conservatory, and the Wisconsin Conservatory of Music.

Later life and career
Randolph played in St. Louis in the early 1920s, then in Bernie Young's band in Milwaukee from 1927 to 1930. He moved to Chicago in 1931 and was a trumpeter and arranger with Louis Armstrong for 1931–32 and again in 1933 and 1935. Randolph also played trumpet on a number of Armstrong's recordings and composed the tune "Old Man Mose". He played with Carroll Dickerson and Dave Peyton in 1934, and led his own Chicago band later in the 1930s. He arranged for such bandleaders as Earl Hines, Woody Herman, Fletcher Henderson, and Duke Ellington, and led a quartet in the 1940s.

From the 1940s Randolph devoted himself mainly to teaching, but recorded as a pianist in 1951. He retired in the 1970s, and died in Chicago on February 2, 1994.

Zilner's daughter, Hattie, became a vocalist; his son, Lucious, became a trumpeter. Both were part of Sun Ra's band in the 1950s.

References

1899 births
1994 deaths
Johnson C. Smith University alumni
Wisconsin Conservatory of Music alumni
American jazz trumpeters
American male trumpeters
People from Dermott, Arkansas
20th-century American musicians
20th-century trumpeters
Jazz musicians from Arkansas
20th-century American male musicians
American male jazz musicians